The North American Mesoscale Model (NAM) is a numerical weather prediction model run by National Centers for Environmental Prediction for short-term weather forecasting. Currently, the Weather Research and Forecasting Non-hydrostatic Mesoscale Model (WRF-NMM) model system serves as the dynamical core of the NAM model. The WRF replaced the Eta model on June 13, 2006. The NAM is run four times a day (00, 06, 12, 18 UTC) out to 84 hours, with 12 km horizontal resolution and with three-hour temporal resolution, providing finer detail than other operational forecast models. Its ensemble is known as the Short Range Ensemble Forecast (SREF) and runs out 87 hours.

References

External links 
 NAM output products
 Model Info
 NAM Graphics output by PSU

National Weather Service numerical models